Robert Jacquinot (31 December 1893–17 June 1980) was a French road racing cyclist, who won two stages in the 1922 Tour de France and 2 stages in the 1923 Tour de France, and wore the yellow jersey for a total of four days. He was born in Aubervilliers, Seine-Saint-Denis and died in Bobigny.

Major results

1922
Circuit de Champagne
Tour de France:
Winner stages 1 and 3
Wearing yellow jersey for three days
1923
Paris - Saint-Etienne
Tour de France:
Winner stages 1 and 5
Wearing yellow jersey for one day

External links

Official Tour de France results for Robert Jacquinot

1893 births
1980 deaths
Sportspeople from Aubervilliers
French male cyclists
French Tour de France stage winners
Cyclists from Île-de-France